The 2008–09 LNBP was the 9th season of the Liga Nacional de Baloncesto Profesional, one of the professional basketball leagues of Mexico. It started on September 4, 2008, and ended on March 18, 2009. The league title was won by Halcones UV Xalapa, which defeated Soles de Mexicali in the championship series, 4–2.

Format 
24 teams participate. The teams are divided in two groups of 12 teams each, called Zonas (zones): Zona Norte (North) and Zona Sur (South). The first 8 teams in each group qualify for the playoffs. The group playoffs have quarterfinals (best-of-5), semifinals (best-of-7) and finals (best-of-7). The winner of each group series qualify for the championship series (best-of-7), named Final de Finales (Final of Finals).

Teams

Regular season

Zona Norte standings

Zona Sur standings

Playoffs 
Source

All-Star Game 
The 2008 LNBP All-Star Game was played in Mexico City at the Gimnasio Olímpico Juan de la Barrera on December 16, 2008. The game was played between Zona Norte and Zona Sur. Zona Sur won, 123–122.

Teams 

Zona Norte
  Noé Alonzo (Tecos de la UAG)
  Antonio García (Tecos de la UAG)
  Keith Gayden (Venados de Nuevo Laredo)
  Greg Lewis (Soles de Mexicali)
  Horacio Llamas (Soles de Mexicali)
  Omar López (Galgos de Tijuana)
  Rommel Marentez (Galgos de Tijuana)
  Ricardo Meléndez (Tecos de la UAG)
  Anthony Pedroza (Soles de Mexicali)
  Antoine Stockman (Venados de Nuevo Laredo)
  Blake Walker (Algodoneros de la Comarca)
  Gerald Williams (Lobos de la UAdeC)
 Coaches:  Alberto Espasandín (Tecos de la UAG) and  Iván Déniz (Soles de Mexicali)

Zona Sur
  Víctor Ávila (Halcones UV Xalapa)
  Gustavo Ayón (Halcones UV Xalapa)
  Kenya Capers (Barreteros de Zacatecas)
  Alfonso Flores (Estrellas Indebasquet del DF)
  Devon Ford (Panteras de Aguascalientes)
  Justin Griffin (Barreteros de Zacatecas)
  Juan Herrera (Santos Reales de San Luis)
  Leroy Hickerson (Halcones UV Xalapa
  Jack Michael Martínez (Halcones UV Veracruz)
  Hernán Salcedo (Ángeles de Puebla)
  Adrián Sánchez (Lechugueros de León)
  Sergio Sánchez (Halcones UV Córdoba)
 Coaches:  Andy Stoglin (Halcones UV Xalapa) and  Manolo Cintrón (Halcones UV Veracruz)

References

External links 
 2008–09 LNBP season on Latinbasket.com

LNBP seasons
2008 in Mexican sports
2009 in Mexican sports
2008–09 in North American basketball